The 2024 Castrol Toyota Formula Regional Oceania Championship will be the second season of the Formula Regional Oceania Championship, and the nineteenth running of the premier open-wheel motorsport category formerly known as the Toyota Racing Series, held in New Zealand. It is scheduled to be held over five consecutive weekends in January and February of 2024.

Entry list 
All drivers will compete with identical Tatuus FT-60 chassis cars powered by 2.0L turbocharged Toyota engines.

Race calendar 
Even before the 2023 season had begun, New Zealand's national motorsport governing body had already announced the 2024 calendar. The championship will again consist of five weekends. The round at Teretonga Park will be dropped, instead the series will return to Euromarque Motorsport Park for the first time since 2018.

The 68th running of the New Zealand Grand Prix will be held as the final race of the season, at Highlands Motorsport Park.

References

External links 

 

Toyota Racing Series
Formula Regional Oceania
Formula Regional Oceania
Formula Regional Oceania